Travis B. Bryan High School, better known as Bryan High, is a public high school located in Bryan, Texas (USA). The school is in the Bryan Independent School District.

In addition to portions of Bryan, the school's attendance boundary includes small portions of College Station.

Athletics

The Bryan Vikings compete in these sports -

Baseball
Basketball
Cross Country
Football
Golf
Powerlifting
Soccer
Softball
Swimming and Diving
Tennis
Track and Field
Volleyball
Water Polo
Wrestling

Football

The school has a 6A football program and is the long time rivals with A&M Consolidated High School in College Station. From 2005 to 2013 Bryan lost every football game between the two schools in their annual "Crosstown Showdown."

Notable alumni
Rod Bernstine, NFL tight end and running back
Curtis Dickey, NCAA track and field champion, NFL running back
Odie Harris, NFL defensive back
David Konderla, bishop of Tulsa
Shawn Slocum, football coach
Cameron Spikes
Syndric Steptoe, NFL wide receiver
Ty Warren, NFL defensive end
Rudy Woods, professional basketball player

References

External links
BHS Website
BHS Twitter
BHS Vikings Football Twitter

High schools in Brazos County, Texas
Public high schools in Texas
Bryan, Texas